Michael Foltýn (born October 6, 1994) is a Czech professional ice hockey player. He is currently playing for HC Oceláři Třinec of the Czech Extraliga.

Foltýn made his Czech Extraliga debut playing with HC Oceláři Třinec during the 2013-14 Czech Extraliga season.

References

External links

1994 births
Living people
HC Oceláři Třinec players
Czech ice hockey defencemen
AZ Havířov players
Sportspeople from Třinec
HC Frýdek-Místek players
LHK Jestřábi Prostějov players
Czech expatriate ice hockey people
Czech expatriate sportspeople in Ukraine
Expatriate ice hockey players in Ukraine